Nowy Gieląd  is a village in the administrative district of Gmina Sorkwity, within Mrągowo County, Warmian-Masurian Voivodeship, in northern Poland.

The village has a population of 17.

References

 Villages in Mrągowo County